The 1895 Colorado Silver and Gold football team was an American football team that represented the University of Colorado as a member of the Colorado Football Association (CFA) during the 1895 college football season. Led by first-year head coach Fred Folsom, Colorado compiled an overall record of 5–1 with a mark of 3–0 in conference play, winning the CFA title, the program's second conference championship.

Folsom served three stints as Colorado's head coach, from 1895 to 1899, 1901 to 1902, and 1908 to 1915, ending his tenure with the most wins in program history. Colorado Stadium was renamed as Folsom Field in 1944, following his death.

Schedule

References

Colorado
Colorado Buffaloes football seasons
Colorado Football Association football champion seasons
Colorado Silver and Gold football